Group 5 of the UEFA Women's Euro 2017 qualifying competition consisted of five teams: Germany, Russia, Hungary, Turkey, and Croatia. The composition of the eight groups in the qualifying group stage was decided by the draw held on 20 April 2015.

The group was played in home-and-away round-robin format. The group winners qualified directly for the final tournament, while the runners-up also qualified directly if they were one of the six best runners-up among all eight groups (not counting results against the fifth-placed team); otherwise, the runners-up advance to the play-offs.

Standings

Matches
Times are CEST (UTC+2) for dates between 29 March and 24 October 2015 and between 27 March and 29 October 2016, for other dates times are CET (UTC+1).

Goalscorers
5 goals

 Alexandra Popp
 Zsanett Jakabfi

3 goals

 Maja Joščak
 Pauline Bremer
 Isabel Kerschowski
 Leonie Maier
 Anja Mittag

2 goals

 Kristina Šundov
 Melanie Behringer
 Sara Däbritz
 Lena Goeßling
 Mandy Islacker
 Lina Magull
 Elena Danilova
 Nadezhda Karpova
 Ekaterina Pantyukhina
 Elena Terekhova

1 goal

 Mateja Andrlić
 Iva Landeka
 Martina Šalek
 Kathrin Hendrich
 Tabea Kemme
 Simone Laudehr
 Melanie Leupolz
 Dzsenifer Marozsán
 Lena Petermann
 Erika Szuh
 Fanny Vágó
 Dóra Zeller
 Margarita Chernomyrdina
 Ekaterina Dmitrenko
 Anna Kozhnikova
 Daria Makarenko
 Ekaterina Sochneva
 Ece Türkoğlu
 Yağmur Uraz

1 own goal

 Sandra Žigić (playing against Russia)
 Evelin Mosdóczi (playing against Turkey)
 Viktória Szabó (playing against Germany)
 Ksenia Tsybutovich (playing against Germany)

References

External links
Standings, UEFA.com

Group 5